The Sea or the Water is an area of the sky in which many water-related, and few land-related, constellations occur. This may be because the Sun passed through this part of the sky during the rainy season.

Most of these constellations are named by Ptolemy:

 Aquarius the Water-bearer
 Capricornus the Sea-goat
 Cetus the Whale
 Delphinus the Dolphin
 Eridanus the Great River
 Hydra the Water serpent
 Pisces the Fishes
 Piscis Austrinus, the Southern Fish (not named by Ptolemy)

Sometimes included are the ship Argo and Crater the Water Cup.

Some water-themed constellations are newer, so are not in this region. They include Hydrus, the lesser water snake; Volans, the flying fish; and Dorado, the swordfish.

See also
Celestial ocean, a mythological concept, not specific to astronomy
Lunar sea

References

+